The 2015 BBL-Pokal was the 48th season of the German Basketball Cup. The Final Four was held in Oldenburg, which gained EWE Baskets Oldenburg automatic qualification. The other six participating teams were selected through the standings in the 2014–15 Basketball Bundesliga.

Participants
The following six teams qualified based on their standings in the 2013–14 BBL.
Alba Berlin
Brose Baskets
Bayern Munich
Telekom Baskets Bonn
ratiopharm ulm
BG Göttingen
EWE Baskets Oldenburg was qualified because the Final Four will be played on their home court.

Bracket

Quarterfinals

Semifinals

Third place game

Final

External links
Official website

BBL-Pokal seasons
BBL-Pokal